Radha Swami Satsang, Dinod (RSSD) is an Indian spiritual organisation with its headquarters in Dinod village in the Bhiwani district of Haryana state. It promotes the Radha Soami sect that was founded by Shiv Dayal Singh on Basant-Panchami day (a spring festival) in January 1861. The Radha Swami Satsang at Dinod (RSSD) was founded by Tarachand.

Media evangelism
Satsangs of the present master, Kanwar Saheb, are broadcast daily on various Indian spiritual television channels, such as Santvani Channel.

Saheb's satsangs are also published in leading Hindi newspapers such as Dainik Bhaskar, Dainik Jagran, Haribhoomi and Punjab Kesari.

Lineage of gurus 

The lineage of gurus in Radha Swami Satsang at Dinod is
 1st Guru: Shiv Dayal Singh (August 1818 - June 1878)
 2nd Guru: Salig Ram (March 1829 - December 1898)
 3rd Guru: Maharishi Shiv Brat Lal (February 1860 - February 1939)
 4th Guru: Ram Singh Arman (September 1895 - 1976)
 5th Guru: Tarachand (August 1925 - January 1997)
 6th Guru: Kanwar Saheb (March 1948 – Present)

Star Monument (Samadhi Sthal) 
A magnificent architecture, star monument is the Samadhi Sthal of 5th Radha Swami Guru, Tarachand who is renowned as Bade Maharaj Ji. This hexagonal structure is constructed in star shape at the elevated height of 6 feet from ground. The monument is 88 feet tall erected without any pillars and columns. This is amazing piece of architecture, that entire building is not having support of concrete pillars. A creative garden is also surrounding this Samadhi which depicts beauty of this place especially under lights.

See also
 Sant Mat

References

External links 
 Radha Swami Satsang, Dinod Official website

Hindu temples in Haryana
Radha Soami
Contemporary Sant Mat
Surat Shabd Yoga
1861 establishments in British India